Ronald James Nelson Orr (born 1954) is a Canadian politician from Alberta. Orr is a member of the Legislative Assembly of Alberta for the electoral district of Lacombe-Ponoka since 2015. Orr served as a member of Executive Council of Alberta in the cabinet of Jason Kenney holding the position of Minister of Culture, Multiculturalism and Status of Women from 2021 to 2022.

Political life 
Orr was elected in the 2015 Alberta general election to represent the electoral district of Lacombe-Ponoka in the 29th Alberta Legislature as a member of the Wildrose Party. Orr was re-elected in the 2019 Alberta general election to the 30th Alberta Legislature.

Orr was appointed to the Cabinet of Jason Kenney as the Minister of Culture, Multiculturalism and Status of Women on July 8, 2021.

During the 2022 United Conservative Party leadership election, Orr endorsed the campaign of Travis Toews. Following Danielle Smith's selection as United Conservative Party leader, Orr was not selected to join Danielle Smith's Cabinet. On October 25, 2022, Orr announced he won't seek re-election.

Electoral history

2015 general election

2019 general election

References

1950s births
Living people
Politicians from Calgary
Wildrose Party MLAs
21st-century Canadian politicians
Canadian carpenters
United Conservative Party MLAs